The men's pole vault event at the 2017 European Athletics Indoor Championships was held on 3 March at 17:00 local time.

Medalists

Records

Results

Final

References

2017 European Athletics Indoor Championships
Pole vault at the European Athletics Indoor Championships